Huang Zuqia (October 2, 1924 – September 7, 2014) was a Chinese theoretical and nuclear physicist, who was elected to be a member of the Chinese Academy of Sciences in 1980. He made contributions to the design of Hydrogen bombs theoretically.

References 

Members of the Chinese Academy of Sciences
1924 births
2014 deaths